BA Connect was a wholly-owned subsidiary airline of British Airways. It was headquartered in Didsbury, Manchester, England, it operated a network of domestic and European services from a number of airports in the United Kingdom on behalf of British Airways. The airline operated as a low-cost carrier, with food sold via a 'buy on board' programme (except for flights to London City Airport).

On 3 November 2006 British Airways announced the sale of BA Connect to Flybe. It formally transferred to Flybe on 25 March 2007.

History 

The company was incorporated on 26 January 1970 as Brymon Aviation Limited which operated as Brymon Airways. On 30 July 1993 the company was renamed Brymon Airways Limited to reflect the operating name.

The company was purchased by British Airways in 1993 and on 28 March 2002 it was merged with British Regional Airlines and was renamed British Airways Citiexpress Ltd operating as BA CitiExpress.

British Airways Citiexpress is recognised for pioneering and attaining CAA approval for the print-at-home boarding pass, one of the first self-service tools of the digital era.

The regional operations of British Airways at Birmingham and Manchester, and the operations of the former CityFlyer Express, were integrated into the new airline later in 2002.

On 1 February 2006 the airline was renamed BA Connect Limited operating as BA Connect and operations moved to a low-cost carrier model, with food sold via a 'buy on board' programme (except for flights to London City Airport). However, allocated seating and a baggage valet service were still available, while lounge access, tier points and BA Miles remained unaffected for those in the Executive Club. Operationally the new service came into effect on 26 March 2006.

BA Connect handled most of British Airways' domestic and European services that do not serve London Heathrow or Gatwick airports.  It had hubs in Birmingham, Bristol, London City, Manchester and Southampton.  From these locations the carrier operated services to several northwest European destinations and also to Glasgow, Edinburgh and Aberdeen.  A few services also operated from Gatwick.  In total, BA Connect flew from 17 airports in the UK and Ireland on 63 routes to major or central regional airports.

On 3 November 2006, British Airways chief executive said that he had reached an agreement for Flybe to purchase BA Connect. BA would ensure that Flybe has sufficient funding in order to achieve its growth targets and the transition out of current BA Connect fleet. In return BA would acquire a 15% stake in the new business. The acquisition (which did not include BA Connect routes to London City or from Manchester to New York) would significantly increase the Flybe route network in both the UK and continental Europe, making Flybe the largest regional airline in Europe. Retention of the London City routes would result in BA retaining the RJ100 aircraft for these domestic and European services.

BA had to pay Flybe a sum of money to take on the company due to Flybe actually taking on a company that would cost them money rather than make profits for the foreseeable future.

Much concern was expressed at the shedding of routes across Scotland, but Flybe stated that BA Connect routes would be kept and expanded. On 6 March 2007 Flybe stated that they would not be operating any former BA Connect services from Bristol. Consequently, the last flights on any of BA Connect's routes from Bristol was on 24 March 2007.

Services 
BA Connect operated from several destinations that were also served by the parent company, and were part of British Airways destinations.  Those that were not served by British Airways itself, mainly UK regional destinations, are listed in British Airways franchise destinations.

Fleet 

The BA Connect fleet included the following aircraft, before the sale to Flybe (March 2007)

1 BAe 146-100 (to Flybe)
2 BAe 146-200 (to Flybe)
1 BAe 146-300 (to Flybe)
10 Avro RJ100 (to BA CityFlyer)
6 Bombardier Dash 8 Q300 (to Flybe)
28 Embraer ERJ 145 (to Flybe)

See also
 List of defunct airlines of the United Kingdom

References

External links 

BA Connect
BA Connect Fleet Age
BA Connect Fleet

Defunct airlines of the United Kingdom
Airlines established in 2006
Former Oneworld affiliate members
Airlines disestablished in 2007
British Airways

da:BA Connect